"Incomplete" is the third single from Hoobastank's album Fight or Flight, released on July 24, 2013.

Charts

References 

Hoobastank songs
Songs written by Dan Estrin
Songs written by Doug Robb
Songs written by Chris Hesse
Song recordings produced by Gavin Brown (musician)
2012 songs